Sudan Evangelical Presbyterian Church (SEPC) was started by American missionaries of the Presbyterian Church in the USA in the northern part of Sudan. Missionaries were expelled in 1964. The SEPC has grown since then in northern and western Sudan as well as in South Sudan as a large percentage of SEPC members moved there in anticipation of forming a new country. The Sudan Evangelical Presbyterian Church is currently under the leadership of Bishop Elias Taban, and desires to plant churches in the Muslim northern Sudan as well as South Sudan.

The church affirms the Apostles Creed, the Westminster Confession of Faith, and the Nicene Creed. It now has 100 congregations, and its partner church is the Reformed Church in America.

References

Presbyterian denominations in Africa
Presbyterianism in Sudan